is a 2007 novel by Tetsuya Honda (誉田 哲也 Honda Tetsuya). It was adapted into a film directed by Tomoyuki Furumaya. Jiro Ando created a manga adaptation.

Characters
 Kaori Isoyama - Riko Narumi
 Sanae Nishogi - Kie Kitano

References

2007 Japanese novels